Rex Airlines (previously known as Regional Express) is an Australian regional airline headquartered in Mascot, New South Wales, operating domestic services within six Australian states. Initially operating its flights exclusively using turboprop aircraft, Rex Airlines introduced jetliner-operated services in March 2021 with flights between Sydney and Melbourne.

Destinations
Rex Airlines operates to the following destinations :

See also
 List of regional airlines

References

External links
Regional Express Main Site

Rex Airlines
Australia aviation-related lists